{{Speciesbox
| name = Wild cherry sphinx
| image = Sphinx drupiferarum MHNT CUT 2010 0 478 Jersey City, Hudson Co, New Jersey - male dorsal.jpg
| image_caption = Sphinx drupiferarum'	
| image2 = Sphinx drupiferarum MHNT CUT 2010 0 478 Jersey City, Hudson Co, New Jersey - male ventral.jpg
| image2_caption = Sphinx drupiferarum ♂  △	
| taxon = Sphinx drupiferarum
| authority = J. E. Smith, 1797
| synonyms = Sphinx utahensis Edwards, 1881Sphinx drupiferarum marginalis Clark, 1936
}}Sphinx drupiferarum, the wild cherry sphinx, is a moth of the  family Sphingidae. The species was first described by James Edward Smith in 1797. 

 Distribution 
It is found from the temperate parts of the United States to southern Canada.

Description 
The wingspan is 75–115 mm. In Canada, there is one generation per year with adults on wing from June to July. In the south, there are two generations per year.

 Biology 
The larvae feed on Prunus (including Prunus serotina), Malus, Syringa vulgaris, Amelanchier nantuckensis and Celtis occidentalis.

References

External links
"Wild cherry sphinx (Sphinx drupiferarum)". Moths of North America''. U.S. Geological Survey Northern Prairie Wildlife Research Center. August 30, 2005.

Sphinx (genus)
Moths described in 1797
Moths of North America